The Back Page, also known as Back Page Live, is an Australian sports television show currently broadcast on Fox Sports on Tuesday nights. It is hosted by Tony Squires, with a roster of panelists including retired Australian professional ironwoman Candice Warner, cricket writer Robert 'Crash' Craddock, broadcaster Ryan 'Fitzy' Fitzgerald and former Australian cricketer Kerry O'Keeffe.

The weekly show features a round-up of the previous week's sporting news, and features interviews with sporting personalities. It covers all major Australian sports as well as international sports.

Current panelists

Former panelists
 Mike Gibson (host, 1997–2012)
 Billy Birmingham (regular panelist, 1997–2012)
 Peter FitzSimons (regular panelist)
 Tracey Holmes (regular panelist)
 Peter Frilingos (regular panelist)
 David Hookes (regular panelist)
 Matt Shirvington (co-host, 2013)
 Kelli Underwood(co-host, 2013–2021)
 Mark Bosnich (regular panelist, 2013–2021)
 Julian Schiller (regular panelist, 2013–2017)
 Merrick Watts (regular panelist, 2017–2020)
 Jamie Soward (regular panelist)

History
Launched in 1997 as The Back Page, the show was originally hosted by journalist Mike Gibson and comedian Billy Birmingham. In 2012, Gibson announced that he was leaving the show after 16 years and 720 episodes. Soon after, Birmingham announced he would not be returning to the show the following year after being informed he'd been demoted to a part-time panelist. In 2013, presenter Tony Squires and athlete Matt Shirvington took up the role of hosting the show. Shirvington left the show the same year, and was replaced by journalist Kelli Underwood.

From 7 October 2017, the show moved from its traditional Tuesday night time slot to air live at 7.00pm Saturday nights on the free-to-air channel One, classified as the shows "Summer Series".  Subsequent repeats are shown on Fox Sports throughout the week following. The episodes were shortened from a 1-hour to 45 minutes run time, and the title was changed to The Back Page as it was previously called when it originally launched. This run was short-lived however, ending on 25 November 2017 after just eight episodes. The show returned to its traditional Tuesday night slot on Fox Sports on 27 February 2018.

The Back Page celebrated its 25th year on air in 2021.

See also

 List of longest-running Australian television series

References

External links
 

1997 Australian television series debuts
2010s Australian television series
English-language television shows
Australian sports television series
Australian television talk shows
Fox Sports (Australian TV network) original programming